Everywhere at Once is the second solo studio album by Lyrics Born. It was released on Anti- in 2008. It peaked at number 192 on the Billboard 200 chart.

Critical reception

At Metacritic, which assigns a weighted average score out of 100 to reviews from mainstream critics, the album received an average score of 66, based on 17 reviews, indicating "generally favorable reviews".

Track listing

Charts

References

External links
 

2008 albums
Lyrics Born albums
Anti- (record label) albums
Albums produced by Jake One